"Mango" is the tenth single by the Bay Area collective Peach Tree Rascals released on October 2, 2019 by Homemade Projects and 10K Projects.

Background and composition 
Peach Tree Rascals had spent the September relocating from San Jose to Los Angeles, celebrating the move with the song. The song talks about having optimism as life goes on and serves as a "reminder to filter out any negative vibes." When asked about the song, the band stated that "'Mango' is about creating positive thoughts even on the worst of days. We live in a world where the pressure put on us to do something we don’t want is too common. […] ‘Mango’ captures the true essence of what [Peach Tree Rascals] is all about."

Music video 
The music video was  directed by Jorge Olazaba over a three-day period in Santa Cruz and includes vivid colors and camera work that represents a carefree day for the band. The video also includes many hand-drawn animations layered over it. Olazaba stated about the video: "I had chosen this location for its vivid colors and overall carefree environment that Santa Cruz represents. As for the random little hand-drawn animations found throughout the video, it looks almost like a little kid started drawing all over his homework. I love that feeling of nostalgia and innocence that it gives off. I wanted the video to be lighthearted, imaginative, and a stress reliever for those viewing it and be as happy as we were making it."

Critical reception 
Kevin McStravick of Operation Every Band gave the song an OEB score of 8 and a popularity score of 6, saying that "[t]here’s a comfortable coolness in Peach Tree Rascals’ music, but the quirky, personable approach gives their sound life. It’s a sound both tripped out and fun, complex but easygoing. Deep, emotive soul like the slowed-down, bassy “Violet” pairs nicely against the funky, sunny nature of “Mariposa” […] It’s a charming sound, but not too sugary to overstay its welcome and a groove that is refreshing in its own creative and youthful way."

References 

Peach Tree Rascals songs
2019 singles
2019 songs